Endothelin 1 (ET-1), also known as preproendothelin-1 (PPET1), is a potent vasoconstrictor peptide produced by vascular endothelial cells. The protein encoded by this gene  EDN1  is proteolytically processed to release  endothelin 1. Endothelin 1 is one of three isoforms of human endothelin.

Sources 

Preproendothelin is precursor of the peptide ET-1. Endothelial cells convert preproendothelin to proendothelin and subsequently to mature endothelin, which the cells release.

Clinical significance 

Endothelin-1 receptor antagonists (Bosentan) are used in the treatment of pulmonary hypertension. Use of these antagonists prevents pulmonary arterial constriction and thus inhibits pulmonary hypertension.

As of 2020, the role of endothelin-1 in affecting lipid metabolism and insulin resistance in obesity mechanisms was under clinical research.

References

External links 
 

Endothelin receptor agonists